Charles Lockyer (died 1752) of Ilchester, Somerset and Ealing, Middlesex, was a British Whig politician who sat in the House of Commons from 1727 to 1747.

Lockyer was the eldest son of Thomas Lockyer of Ilchester, and his wife  Elizabeth.  He belonged to a   dissenting family, who owned property at Ilchester.
  
Lockyer was   a chief accountant in the  South Sea Company, and gave evidence to the secret House of Commons committee set up to inquire into the South Sea bubble. He was returned unopposed as Whig Member of Parliament for Ilchester at the 1727 British general election. He was returned after a contest at the  1734 British general election, and was unopposed again at the  1741 British general election. He voted consistently with the Government. At the 1747 British general election, he stood down in favour of his younger brother Thomas.  
 
Lockyer died unmarried of a paralytic disorder on  13 February 1752. He left property in his will to his sister Mary Maby, his cousin Thomas Lockyer, and an illegitimate son John Lockyer, born to Ann Green, a servant.

References

1752 deaths
Members of the Parliament of Great Britain for English constituencies
British MPs 1727–1734
British MPs 1734–1741
British MPs 1741–1747